William Russell Craft (October 15, 1919 – January 12, 2009) was an American football defensive back in the National Football League (NFL)for the Philadelphia Eagles and the Pittsburgh Steelers.  He played college football at the University of Alabama and was drafted in the fifteenth round of the 1943 NFL Draft.  In 1948, Craft was a key member of the Eagles in what became known as the Blizzard Bowl, in which the Eagles’ defense overwhelmed the Cardinals on the way to a 7–0 victory that earned Philadelphia its first N.F.L. championship. In 1949, he was a notable player in helping the Eagles win a second World Championship, a 1947 Division Championship, and was selected to the Pro Bowl twice, in 1951 and 1952.

Craft had some other notable achievements.  In 1950, against the Chicago Cardinals, the Eagles' defense recorded eight interceptions, including an NFL-record-tying four by Craft. Craft had 22 career interceptions. Then in 1952, while playing against the Pittsburgh Steelers, Craft was able to block three Extra points (PATs).

Craft was also a defensive coach for the Steelers.

After football, Craft served as the sheriff of Brooke County, West Virginia from 1969 to 1972.

References

External links
 

1919 births
2009 deaths
People from Humphreys County, Tennessee
Players of American football from Tennessee
American football defensive backs
Alabama Crimson Tide football players
Philadelphia Eagles players
Pittsburgh Steelers players
Eastern Conference Pro Bowl players
American police chiefs